Honda Silver Wing may refer to:

Honda GL500 motorcycle
Honda GL650 motorcycle
Honda Silver Wing (scooter)